Keith Bullen may refer to:

 Keith Edward Bullen (1906–1976), New Zealand-born mathematician and geophysicist
 Keith Bullen (poet) (died 1946), British poet and teacher